Bannwaldsee is a lake near Schwangau, Bavaria, Germany. At an elevation of 785.9 m, its surface area is 2.28 km².

See also 
List of lakes in Bavaria

External links 
 

Lakes of Bavaria
Ostallgäu